Tim Burke may refer to:
Tim Burke (ice hockey) (born 1955), American ice hockey player/coach
Tim Burke (baseball) (born 1959), Major League Baseball pitcher
Tim Burke (biathlete) (born 1982), American biathlete
Tim Burke (gridiron football), American football coach
Tim Burke (visual effects supervisor) (born 1965)
Tim Burke (wrestler) (1960–2011), American professional wrestler
Tim Burke (golfer) (born 1986), American golfer
Timothy Burke (businessman), contractor and railroad owner
Timothy Burke (politician) (1866–1926), member of the Wisconsin Legislature